Derek Erdman is an artist in Chicago, Illinois. His notable works and projects include his vibrant paintings, irreverent prints, phone-prank album Kathy McGinty and his portrayal of Rap Master Maurice.

Erdman's work has appeared in the Chicago Reader newspaper, Roctober magazine, and on the cover of the acclaimed 2006 novel Lullabies for Little Criminals  In 2010, Erdman contributed to MTV's music website and became a regular contributor to Seattle's the Stranger. The band Death Cab for Cutie mourned Erdman's 2017 departure from Seattle in the song "You Moved Away."

Paintings
Erdman is a prolific painter who has striven to keep his art affordable and accessible.

Phone pranks

Kathy McGinty
Kathy McGinty is an album of prank phone calls recorded by Erdman and a friend in 2002. The eponymous Kathy is actually a collection of pre-recorded phrases on a Yamaha SU10 sampler. Callers expecting to have phone sex with a young woman instead conversed with "Kathy," who repeats herself often, responds bizarrely to questions, and becomes increasingly unhinged as the calls progress.

Professor Jacob Smith of Northwestern University discussed the cultural significance of the Kathy McGinty calls in his 2008 book Vocal Tracks: Performance and Sound Media. He wrote that Kathy uses vocal performance "to explore the boundary between human and machine, and to search for the lines dividing technology, self, and performance."

In a 2002 BBC interview, Dan the Automator revealed that Kathy McGinty was the album he had most recently purchased.

Rap Master Maurice
Rap Master Maurice is a character portrayed by Erdman. For a fee, "Maurice" delivers "revenge raps" over the phone.

The revenge rap concept is as follows: if you have an incident or a problem with another person, you can pay Rap Master Maurice seventeen dollars, and he will write a rap about your issue.  Then he will deliver the rap in a phone call.

Rap Master Maurice was created when one of Erdman's friends was having a personal issue with a co-worker.  The friend asked Erdman to give the co-worker a warning, which Erdman considered too threatening. Consequently, Erdman decided "perhaps i would do it in rap form". Erdman pursued the Rap Master Maurice act because he wanted to be more "service oriented" and "live off the things [he] made and not have to have another job".

Erdman has appeared as Rap Master Maurice on Chicago's CAN TV musical television show Chic-a-Go-Go and on a track of the Ohio noise band SLOTH / MAMMOTH split 7-inch. He also has appeared as himself discussing Rap Master Maurice on Fuel TV, WireTap, and Outside the Loop in Chicago.

Revenge raps
 Ira Glass's Dog
 Andy Bichlbaum and Mike Bonanno from The Yes Men
 Mick Collins from The Dirtbombs
 Rod Arquette from Bonneville International

Other works

The Great Gatsby
When F. Scott Fitzgerald's The Great Gatsby entered the public domain in 2021, Erdman published an illustrated edition with the text of the famous novel in all caps, with no punctuation.

The Beauty Pageant
Derek was the co-frontman for alternative rock band The Beauty Pageant.

Miscellany
In April 2020, Erdman's apartment was featured in the online version of Architectural Digest.

References

External links
Official website
Official Site of Rap Master Maurice
A Compilation of Rap Master Maurice Performances
Rap Master Maurice LIVE! Chic-A-Go-Go, from Chic-a-Go-Go's video channel on youtube.com, performing "Insane Vote for McCain"

American contemporary painters
Postmodern artists
American male musicians
Rappers from Chicago
20th-century American painters
American male painters
21st-century American painters
21st-century American male artists
Artists from Chicago
American pop artists
Living people
Year of birth missing (living people)
20th-century American male artists